Liv i luckan (roughly "Action Behind the Calendar Window") was the 1980 edition of Sveriges Radio's Christmas Calendar.

Plot
Reporters Maud Nylin and Ulf Billberger visit various places in Sweden.

References
 

1980 radio programme debuts
1980 radio programme endings
Sveriges Radio's Christmas Calendar